Perite is a mineral that has a general chemical formula of PbBiO2Cl. The name is given for Per Adolf Geijer, a Swedish economic geologist with the Geological Survey of Sweden, who discovered the mineral in 1960 outside of Langban, Sweden. Perite is orthorhombic, space group Cmcm {C2/m 2/c 21/m}. In terms of its optical properties, Perite is anisotropic which means the velocity of light varies depending on direction through the mineral (i.e. it is birefringent).  Its calculated relief is 1.45-1.461, which is moderate. It is colorless in plane polarized light, and it is weakly pleochroic. Perite is found in areas near igneous extrusions in places like the Western United States, Southern Australia, and scattered around Europe.

Crystallography 
Perite belongs to the Orthorhombic crystal system, and has the properties of 2/m 2/m 2/m crystal class. Therefore, perite has 3 mirror planes and 3 twofold rotation axes.

References 

Bismuth minerals
Halide minerals
Lead minerals
Orthorhombic minerals
Minerals in space group 63